St. Bernard Parish Public Schools is a school district headquartered in unincorporated St. Bernard Parish, Louisiana, United States. The district operates public schools in the parish.

School uniforms
The district requires students to wear school uniforms.

Schools

All schools are located in unincorporated communities, as no incorporated communities exist in St. Bernard Parish.

High school(s):
 Chalmette High School (Chalmette)

Middle schools:
 Andrew Jackson Middle School (Chalmette)
 St. Bernard Middle School (St. Bernard)
 Trist Middle School (Meraux)

Primary schools
 Arabi Elementary School (Arabi)
Arlene Meraux Elementary School (Chalmette)
 Chalmette Elementary School (Chalmette)
 J. F. Gauthier Elementary School (Poydras)
 Joseph J. Davies Elementary School (Meraux)
 Lacoste Elementary School (Chalmette)
 W. Smith Elementary

Alternative schools:
 C.F. Rowley Alternative School (Chalmette)

The district plans to re-open additional schools when the enrollment dictates the opening of additional schools. In late 2015, land was donated to the St. Bernard Parish School Board in Chalmette by the Meraux Foundation, and will be the future site of Arlene Meraux Elementary School.

Formerly open schools
The following schools were open before Katrina. As of 2007 they have not been re-opened:

High Schools:
 Andrew Jackson Fundamental High School (Chalmette) (now a middle school) 
 St. Bernard high School (St. Bernard) (now a middle school)

Middle schools:
 Chalmette Middle School (Chalmette) (now an elementary school)
 P. G. T. Beauregard Middle School (St. Bernard) (now an elementary school)

Elementary schools:
 C. F. Rowley Elementary School (Chalmette) (now an alternative school)
 Sebastien Roy Elementary School (St. Bernard)
 Milladon Elementary School (Violet)

Pre-Schools:
 Arabi Preschool (Arabi)

After Hurricane Katrina, classes were held at Chalmette High School under the St. Bernard Unified School, or SBUS. The school dissolved in 2006 and separated into Chalmette High School and Andrew Jackson Elementary School.

References

External links
 St. Bernard Parish Public Schools

Saint Bernard Parish Public Schools
Public Schools